89.3 Max Radio (DWIF 89.3 MHz) is an FM station owned and operated by Iddes Broadcast Group. Its studios and transmitter are located at 116 M.L. Tagarao St., Brgy. Ilayang Iyam, Lucena.

References

External links
Max Radio FB Page
Max Radio Website

Radio stations in Lucena, Philippines
Radio stations established in 2007